Palmview South is a census-designated place (CDP) in Hidalgo County, Texas. The population was 5,575 at the 2010 United States Census. It is part of the McAllen–Edinburg–Mission Metropolitan Statistical Area.

Geography
Palmview South is located at  (26.219769, -98.374852).

According to the United States Census Bureau, the CDP has a total area of 3.0 square miles (7.9 km2), of which 3.0 square miles (7.8 km2) is land and 0.04 square mile (0.1 km2) (0.99%) is water.

Demographics
As of the census of 2000, there were 6,219 people, 1,714 households, and 1,523 families residing in the CDP. The population density was 2,066.7 people per square mile (797.7/km2). There were 2,950 housing units at an average density of 980.4/sq mi (378.4/km2). The racial makeup of the CDP was 78.71% White, 0.19% African American, 0.05% Native American, 0.08% Asian, 0.02% Pacific Islander, 19.81% from other races, and 1.14% from two or more races. Hispanic or Latino of any race were 85.17% of the population.

There were 1,714 households, out of which 49.1% had children under the age of 18 living with them, 76.3% were married couples living together, 9.7% had a female householder with no husband present, and 11.1% were non-families. 9.6% of all households were made up of individuals, and 6.2% had someone living alone who was 65 years of age or older. The average household size was 3.63 and the average family size was 3.89.

In the CDP, the population was spread out, with 35.7% under the age of 18, 10.1% from 18 to 24, 25.6% from 25 to 44, 14.4% from 45 to 64, and 14.3% who were 65 years of age or older. The median age was 28 years. For every 100 females, there were 96.7 males. For every 100 females age 18 and over, there were 92.1 males.

The median income for a household in the CDP was $21,649, and the median income for a family was $22,292. Males had a median income of $15,387 versus $11,538 for females. The per capita income for the CDP was $7,912. About 31.6% of families and 38.3% of the population were below the poverty line, including 51.8% of those under age 18 and 16.1% of those age 65 or over.

Education
Palmview South is served by the La Joya Independent School District. Zoned schools include:
 Elementary: Enrique Camarena, Jose de Escandon, Guillermo Flores, and Leo J. Leo.
 Middle: C. Chavez and Irene Garcia
 Palmview High School and La Joya High School

In addition, South Texas Independent School District operates magnet schools that serve the community.

References

Census-designated places in Hidalgo County, Texas
Census-designated places in Texas